Allmersbach im Tal is a municipality in the Rems-Murr district of Baden-Württemberg, Germany. It belongs to the Stuttgart Region (middle Neckar Region until 1992) and to the boundary area of the Stuttgart Metropolitan Region.

History
Allmersbach im Tal was first mentioned in 1291, relating to the gifting of goods from the Countess Richinza von Löwenstein to the Teutonic Order of Winnenden. Owing to this gifting, Manorialism came into the hands of the Dominican Monastery Weiler bei Esslingen. In the 16th Century the Reformation lead to the town falling under the jurisdiction of Württemberg. Until 1712 Allmersbach im Tal belonged to the monastery court mastery and until 1807 to the monasterial administration of the monastery Weiler bei Esslingen. 

With the new administrative structure of the Kingdom of Württemberg, Allmersbach was assigned to the Backnang offices. 

During NS-rule, 1938 reforms assigned Allmersbach to the Backnang district. In 1945 the town was a part of the American Zone of the Ally occupied Germany, this made it a part of the newly founded Württemberg-Baden which then dissolved into the state Baden-Württemberg. 

Geography
The municipality (Gemeinde) of Allmersbach lies at the center of the Rems-Murr district of Baden-Württemberg, one of the 16 States of the Federal Republic of Germany. The municipal area also includes portions of the Schurwald and Welzheim Forest. Elevation above sea level in the municipal area ranges from a high of  Normalnull (NN) to a low of  NN.

The Federally-protected Sommerrain nature reserve is located in Allmersbach's municipal area.

Area division (German)

Politics
Allmersbach is in a municipal association (Verwaltungsgemeinschaft) with the city of Backnang and the municipalities of Althütte, Aspach, Auenwald, Burgstetten, Kirchberg an der Murr, Oppenweiler, and Weissach im Tal.

Mayors 

 1975–1999: Rüdiger Kieninger
 1999–2021: Ralf Wörner
 since 2021: Patrizia Rall

Coat of arms
Allmersbach's coat of arms displays a crossbow, in red and with its trigger guard facing right, upon a field of silver. The coat of arms was approved for official use and a corresponding municipal flag issued by the Federal Ministry of the Interior on 16 September 1965.

Transportation
Allermsbach is connected to German's network of roadways by its local Landesstraßen and Kreisstraßen. Local public transportation is provided by the Verkehrs- und Tarifverbund Stuttgart.

References

External links
 

Rems-Murr-Kreis
Württemberg